Barletta was an Italian cargo liner built during the 1930s and later became an auxiliary cruiser of the  (Royal Navy) during World War II.

History

Four holds with a capacity of  allowed a deadweight of 1231 (or 1220, or 1240) tons, and the cabins had a capacity of 82 passengers (for other sources 68, or 22 in first class, 24 in second and 22 in third).

Civilian career
On March 21, 1932, the Puglia company merged with some other Adriatic shipping companies, to become the San Marco Navigation Company, based in Venice, which on April 4 of the same year became . Barletta then followed these changes of owner, finally becoming part of the  fleet.

In her first years the ship was used for the transport of passengers and goods on the line n. 42, between the Italian Adriatic coast, Dalmatia and Albania.

According to some sources, however, the service continued until 7 March 1937. On 20 April 1937 the ship was deployed to Palma de Mallorca with the task of patrolling the Iberian coast, as part of the Spanish Civil War, alternating in this role with her sister Adriatico. On 24 May, while she was moored in Majorca, Barletta was hit by a bomb during an air attack by the Republican Air Force; killing six wounding three others.

A few days later, at the end of May, the ship was escorted to La Spezia (where she arrived on May 28) and underwent the necessary repairs. In August, she received the false name of Rio and, under Spanish flag, was deployed to Favignana, to prevent ships carrying supplies for the Spanish Republican troops to cross the Strait of Sicily.

On 21 September 1937, the ship ended her patrols in the Sicilian channel and from 10 November, was based at Tobruk to control the transit of Republican ships in the eastern basin of the Mediterranean. During the Spanish war, Barletta/Rio carried out a total of four surveillance/interception missions.

In 1938 the ship was returned to the Adriatica company and resumed the civil service, sailing on the lines 43 and 43 B, which linked the ports of Venice, Bari, Rhodes, and Smyrna, along with various cities in Greece, Albania, and Turkey.

She made six voyages (three from La Spezia to Cadiz and three from Genoa to Barcelona) and carrying a total of 857 men and 2172 tons of provisions for the civilian population.

On 25 March 1939 the ship resumed the service of transporting goods and passengers, but only for a short time; already on 6 April, she was again requisitioned for naval service. She left Brindisi for Durazzo and participated as a command ship in the operations for the occupation of Albania.

On August 2 of the same year the ship returned in civil service on the route Venice-Trieste-Brindisi-Bari-Lero-Calino-Coo-Rodi-Alessandria of Egypt.

World War II

1940
On 12 May 1940 Barletta was again requisitioned by the  while in Durazzo. Enrolled on the same date in the role of the auxiliary naval ship of the state as an auxiliary cruiser, the vessel received the code D 16 and was converted for naval service, including an armament composed of two  /45 Mod. 1917 guns, four  machine-guns and ferroguides for the transport and the laying of 60 mines. The ship received the name code of Berlina.

On 6 June 1940, after the completion of the conversion works, the unit was employed as minelayer and carried out the laying of minefields off Gallipoli, Santa Maria di Leuca and Durazzo. On 10 June, date of Italy's entry in the Second World War, the Barletta was framed, as a minelayer, in the Gruppo Navi Ausiliarie Dipartimentali del Dipartimento Militare Marittimo "Jonio e Basso Adriatico", based in Taranto.
On 7 July the ship left Brindisi and, sent to Libya, began laying new minefields, this time in the waters of Benghazi and Tripoli, returning to Italy on 12 August.

On 20 August the ship was assigned to the newly formed  and was tasked to escort troop convoys to Albania.

Starting from 5 September 1940, Barletta began to escort convoys; at first she was employed on the Bari-Durazzo route with occasional escorts to Tobruk and Benghazi in North Africa, the auxiliary cruiser was then used also in the waters of Greece and the Aegean Sea.

On 24 December, the ship left Brindisi and, along with the torpedo boat , escorted a convoy of the troop ships Firenze, Argentina, and Italia and the transport Narenta to Vlora. She launched a torpedo against Barletta, which, having sighted the weapon in time, was able to avoid it by quickly turning to port. At 13:20, however, Firenze was torpedoed by Papanikolis in position 40°34' N and 19°02' E and began to sink a dozen miles west/northwest of Saseno. Barletta recovered 874 men, and Andromeda saved another 29, out of a total of 996 embarked aboard Firenze; fatalities amounted to 93 men. Barletta reported some damage to nine ships during the rescue operations, while Firenze, abandoned adrift, sank in the night of 24/25 December.

1941
Barletta went into dock for repairs to damage sustained during the convoy before returning to active service in January 1941. That month, she got underway for another operation but accidentally collided with the steamer Merano. The escort group left Brindisi and escorted the convoy, which landed the Italian expeditionary force at Argostoli (Cefalonia).

In September 1941, Barletta was redeployed in Piraeus, Greece, to escort the merchant ships sailing in the Aegean Sea. During this period, she also carried out two missions to Tobruk. While on the way on 19 September, the ships encountered the British submarine . The destroyers launched depth charges against Torbay but failed to inflict any damage.

On the afternoon of 19 October 1941, Barletta and the torpedo boats , Altair, and  sailed from Piraeus as escort for a convoy of four merchant ships (Città di Agrigento, Città di Marsala, Salzburg, Tagliamento) directed to Candia. That evening, at 19:30, Altair struck a mine in the Saronic Gulf that had been laid eleven days before by the British submarine . Altair had her bow blown off and caught fire and was forced to stop. Barletta and Monzambano continued on with the rest of the convoy, while Lupo went alongside Altair and took off her surviving crew (124 men out of a total of 139). Lupo attempted to take Altair under tow, but at 02:47 on 20 October, Altair sank. Earlier on the 19th, the torpedo boat  had left Piraeus to rescue Altair was mined and sank in the same minefield.

In December 1941, Barletta ran aground west of Euboea in the Gulf of Salonika.

1942
On 17 January 1942, the ship left Piraeus to escort a convoy that consisted of the Italian transports Città di Savona and Città di Alessandria and the German vessel Livorno to Suda. The following day, the submarine  attacked the convoy without success.

Barletta and the German minelayer  laid a minefield off Zylakes, Greece, from 2 to 3 July 1942. They were escorted by Lupo and Cassiopea and the German destroyer .

Barletta was used as a transport on 16 September; carrying a load of gasoline in drums, she left Suda in company with the destroyer , bound for Tobruk in North Africa. The following day, the British submarine  attempted unsuccessfully to torpedo Barletta, and she arrived in Tobruk undamaged later that morning.

The ship made another voyage to North Africa, this time from Palermo to Bizerta on 22–23 November. She was escorted by the torpedo boat , and she again came under attack by a British submarine, shortly before she reached Bizerta. She reached harbor without incident and later proceeded to Tunis.

Between 29 and 30 November, Barletta and the destroyer  laid two sections of the minefields S 91 and S 92, with 172 and 154 mines respectively.

On 12 December 1942, the ship returned to Taranto. Based in the Apulian port, the unit was employed for a short time in the escort of traffic to and from Tunisia, before being subjected to work in the Taranto Arsenal.

1943
On April 3, 1943, once the work was completed, Barletta was again sent to the Aegean, carrying out both convoy escort missions and the laying of minefields off Apulia and the Ionian Islands.

The announcement of the Armistice of Cassibile on 3 September surprised the ship in its eponymous city, which remained under the control of Italian and Allied troops, thus avoiding its loss.

On 8 October 1943 the Barletta was part of the first Italian convoy on behalf of the Allies, which left from Augusta and headed for Algiers. Upon return from this mission, the auxiliary cruiser returned to Taranto on 17 October. Eight days later, on 25 October, Barletta was struck off the rolls of the auxiliary state fleet.

A first salvo of bombs fell forward of Barletta, causing a fire at the bow, near the ammunition magazine, then, at about 19:45, the ship was hit by several bombs especially on the side facing the sea. The crew, led by the chief engineer, tried to suppress the flames which were seriously threatening the magazine in the bow, but at 21:15 a nearby vessel exploded, inflicting further damage on Barletta. The magazine eventually caught fire and exploded, fatally damaging Barletta, which around nine o'clock in the morning of 3 December rolled over on her side and sank. A total of forty men were killed and another forty-four were wounded.

Postwar
The recovery of the wreck, which lay heeling 87° in twelve meters of water, began in May 1945 and ended in September 1948.

In the October 1948 the wreck of the refloated Barletta, was towed to Trieste to be rebuilt. On 25 September 1949 the ship was again in service as a cargo liner, with a gross tonnage of 1966 gt, a net tonnage of 1060 gt, a deadweight capacity of 1240 dwt and a capacity of 82 passengers (32 in first class, 24 in second class and 26 in third class), starting again the regular service for Adriatica: the first voyage, on the route Trieste-Venice-Bari-Piraeus-Istanbul-Smirne, started on 1 October 1949.

In 1951 the Adriatica S.A. di Navigazione became Adriatica S.p.A. di Navigazione. In 1956 the Barletta was assigned to another line, which touched Trieste, Venice, Dalmatia, Piraeus, Heraklion and Calamata.

On 9 (or 18) September 1962 the old motor vessel was laid up in the port of Trieste and in 1965 was dismantled by the company SIDEMAR.

Notes

Bibliography
 
 
 
 

Auxiliary cruisers of the Regia Marina
1931 ships
Ships built by Cantieri Riuniti dell'Adriatico
Ships sunk by aircraft during the air raid on Bari